Shady Grove is an unincorporated community in Jackson County, Florida, United States.

References

Unincorporated communities in Jackson County, Florida
Unincorporated communities in Florida